Dennis is an incorporated town in Parker County, Texas, USA. Its elevation is 728 feet (222 m).  On May 6, 2017, voters approved incorporation of Dennis. It has a post office, with the ZIP code of 76439.

N. M. Dennis, a local judge, founded the community at the spot of a bridge across the Brazos River in 1892.  The community's post office was opened in 1895.  Today, FM 1543 passes through the community.

As of the 2000 census the town has 90 residents. The town includes a post office, a volunteer fire station, Dennis First Baptist Church, and Sugar Tree Golf Course,. The town is served by Brock ISD,. There have been many attempts over the years to open a market in the town, but they have all failed for various reasons.

History
In 1892, after a bridge was built across the Brazos River, Judge N. M. Dennis, a Parker County lawyer and farmer, developed the community to serve the farmers and ranchers of the area.

Geography

The Brazos River runs through the middle of town. The farm to market road (FM) that passes through Dennis is 1189.

References

External links
Profile of Dennis from the Handbook of Texas Online

Unincorporated communities in Parker County, Texas
Unincorporated communities in Texas
Dallas–Fort Worth metroplex